The Australia national cricket team toured New Zealand in February 1998 and played a four-match series of Limited Overs Internationals (LOI) against the New Zealand national cricket team which was drawn 2–2. New Zealand were captained by Stephen Fleming and Australia by Steve Waugh.

One Day Internationals (ODIs)

The series was tied 2-2.

1st ODI

2nd ODI

3rd ODI

4th ODI

References

External links

1998 in Australian cricket
1998 in New Zealand cricket
1998
International cricket competitions from 1997–98 to 2000
New Zealand cricket seasons from 1970–71 to 1999–2000